J. Ira Davis (July 8, 1870 – December 21, 1942) was an infielder in Major League Baseball. He went to the University of Pennsylvania and played for the New York Giants in 1899. He remained active in the minor leagues through 1908.

External links

1870 births
1942 deaths
Major League Baseball first basemen
Major League Baseball shortstops
New York Giants (NL) players
19th-century baseball players
Baseball players from Pennsylvania
Harrisburg Ponies players
Lebanon Cedars players
Pittsfield Colts players
Hazleton Quay-kers players
Pottsville Colts players
New Orleans Pelicans (baseball) players
Springfield Ponies players
Youngstown Puddlers players
Norfolk Braves players
Grand Rapids Rippers players
Grand Rapids Gold Bugs players
Philadelphia Athletics (minor league) players
New Bedford Whalers (baseball) players
New Bedford Browns players
Taunton Herrings players
Danbury Hatters players
Watsonville Hayseeds players
Watsonville Gardiners players
New Haven Blues players
Norwich Witches players
Toronto Maple Leafs (International League) players
St. Joseph Saints players
Sacramento Senators players
Denver Grizzlies (baseball) players
Des Moines Midgets players
Kansas City Blue Stockings players
Portland Green Gages players
Salt Lake City Elders players
Portland Browns players
Butte Miners players
Butte Fruit Pickers players
Oakland Oaks (baseball) players